The Baltimore County Advocate was a weekly newspaper published in Towsontown, Baltimore, Maryland from February 24, 1850 to December 31, 1864. It was founded by Eleazer F. Church, who had previous experience as a printer for the Doylestown Democrat, and started the Advocate in order to promote the municipal separation of Baltimore County and Baltimore city as well as African American emancipation. The paper's headquarters was relocated from Baltimore to Towson, the new county seat, in 1853. Church sold the paper in 1865 to Henry C. Longnecker and his brother John, who renamed the publication to The Baltimore County Union.

References 

Defunct newspapers published in Maryland
1850 establishments in Maryland
Publications established in 1850
Newspapers published in Baltimore
1864 disestablishments in Maryland
Publications disestablished in 1864
Defunct weekly newspapers